Stari dvor (lit. "Old Palace") was the royal residence of the Obrenović dynasty. Today it houses the City Assembly of Belgrade. The palace is located on the corner of Kralja Milana and Dragoslava Jovanovića streets in Belgrade, Serbia, opposite Novi dvor (New Palace).

Great military hospital 
During the Austrian occupation of northern Serbia 1717-39, several hospitals were established in Belgrade, including the Great military hospital. Based on the Austrian plans, the hospital was set outside of the Belgrade Fortress ("Danubian" or "German Belgrade"), in the Serbian part of the city. As shown on the map of Belgrade by Nicolas François de Spar, the Tsarigrad Road began at the Württemberg Gate (Stambol Gate), at the modern Republic Square, and headed towards "Marko's cemetery" in Tašmajdan. The hospital was situated on the road's right side, where the modern Stari Dvor is located. Behind the hospital there was a large garden and further behind it, across the road was the military cemetery. Later "Marko's market" developed on the spot and today it is the area surrounding the House of the National Assembly of Serbia. Based on the drawings by de Spar, the hospital was quite big. The building was large, with rectangular base with the risalit type additions on the corners of the southern façade and large yard with three smaller buildings. It had one floor with numerous rooms. It is not mentioned in the 1728 Census so some historians believed that it was built after that year, but the census counted only the buildings within the fortress. After Austria lost the Austro-Turkish War of 1737–1739, the northern Serbia, including Belgrade, was returned to the Turks. One of the provisions of the 1739 Treaty of Belgrade stated that Austria had to demolish all the fortifications and military and civilian buildings it has constructed during the occupation. Many Baroque buildings were demolished. However, Austria didn't demolish the buildings outside of the fortress walls, including the Great military hospital, which, albeit as a ruin, survived until the next Austrian occupation in 1788.

History

Development of the compound 

Stojan Simić, a politician and a businessman, member of the influential Simić family, notable in the 19th century Serbia both in politics and culture, purchased the lot in the late 1830s. It was a piece of marshland which encompassed the modern features of Old Palace, Pioneers Park and Park Aleksandrov. Simić drained the marsh, filled and leveled the terrain and on the northern side of the modern Kralja Milana street constructed a house 1840-1842. The edifice became known as the Old Konak. Development of the first Serbian royal compound began in 1843, when the ruling prince Alexander Karađorđević purchased the konak with the surrounding garden.

In the 1850s, additional building was constructed next to Old Konak, to the north, and colloquially called Mali dvor or Mali konak ("Little Palace" or "Little Konak"). When the Obrenović dynasty was restored in 1858, they moved in the residences. As an heir apparent, Prince Michael used the Little Palace. The palaces were surrounded by the auxiliary buildings, servants' quarters, horse stables, etc. Ruling prince Miloš Obrenović, Michael's father, decided in 1858 to build a new palace for his son, which was built next to the palace's garden, to the south on the location of modern Novi Dvor, which became known as the Dvor sa kulama ("Palace with towers"). Upon ascending to the throne in 1860, Michael decided to use the Old Konak, while part of the state administration was located in the Palace with towers (ministries of foreign and internal affairs).

Instigated by King Milan, the palace itself was built between 1882 and 1884, according to the design of Aleksandar Bugarski, in the style of academism of the 19th century, with intention to surpass all existing residences of the Serbian rulers. In order to build the new palace, the Little Palace had to be demolished first. Jointly with the new palace, the Marshall's building (Maršalat) was built behind it. The building was upgraded in 1922, being adapted into the large, semicircular building. The Old Konak, in which the Aleksandar and his wife, Queen Draga were assassinated during the 1903 May Coup, was demolished in 1904.

English author Herbert Vivien, who visited the palace by the end of the 19th century, described in detail its interior: "At the left side, there is a fine ball room, with walls of lemon-yellow colour, with huge white lusters of Venetian glass, glistening nicely during the state festivities, lit by electric light. After passing the large reception hall, you enter the banquet hall. Everything is glistening in that hall: starting from the floor up to the carved mahogany table. Some sixty guests may be seated around that table. Leather-upholstered chairs are of the colour of autumn leaves. What is most impressive, is the good taste characterizing all objects, both those for use and the adornments. The admiration is even more caused by the beautiful carved ceilings, inherited from the Turkish era and fashion."

A number of important events from the time of the political power of the Obrenović dynasty are linked to the Old Palace: the Palace was built when Serbia was proclaimed a Kingdom; in that same building, King Milan abdicated in favor of his son, Aleksandar, on 22 February 1889. Between 1903 and 1914, the Old Palace was the residence of the Karadjordjević dynasty.

World Wars and Interbellum 

The Palace was damaged in both World Wars. After World War I the Palace was repaired, while the first important restoration was done around 1930. The complex, and the royal garden, were entered through monumental, decorative stone arches with gates.

In 1919 and 1920, meetings of the Provisional National Assembly took place there. Royal festivities and receptions of foreign guests took place there until 1941. It remained the royal residence until 1922 (King Peter, 1903–21, King Alexander, 1921–22), until the neighboring Novi Dvor became royal palace in 1922. In order to construct the Novi Dvor, the Palace with the towers had to be demolished. 

In 1922 the Maršalat was adapted on the design of architect Momir Korunović. The original edifice was modest and ground-level, which hosted the royal guard. Korunović's design of the eastern façade was mostly plain, but the western, facing the court, was richly decorated with ornaments. The Maršalat, including the Ministry of the Court and royal administration, occupied the central part of the building, while the wings had apartments for royal guests, which partially hastened the construction as it needed to host the guests of the royal wedding between King Alexander and Princess Maria.

During World War II, the palace was bombed and partially demolished on the very first day of the German attack, during the bombing of Belgrade on 6 April 1941. German soldiers were often taking photos in front of the ruined building. First groups of arrested Jews were sent by the Germans to clear the rubble. Soon, the reconstruction of the building began but wasn't finished until October 1944 when the city was liberated as the dome remained demolished.

After World War II 

The repair and re-arrangement of the Old Palace after World War II lasted until 1947. During that period, the architecture of the building was significantly changed. The two domes facing the garden and the sculptures of eagles were removed, while the façade facing the present Bulevar kralja Aleksandra was completely changed. Since that time, the building housed the Presidium of the National Assembly, then the federal government, and, since 1961, the City Assembly of Belgrade. The auxiliary buildings were demolished after 1945.

After the war, the Maršalat was adapted into the Ethnographic Museum. In 1952 the museum was relocated to the former Belgrade Stock Exchange building at Studentski Trg, where it is still today. The building of the Maršalat was demolished in 1957. It is not known why, as it ranked among the most beautiful buildings in Belgrade. There are few stories, considered urban myths today. One is that it was demolished by the Communist authorities on ideological reasons, but there are building which were much more dynastic and royal, but survived. The other is that it bothered one of the top Communist officials and Tito's closest aide, Moša Pijade. In 1953-1954 he worked in the Old Palace, as deputy president of the Federal Executive Council ("vice-president of the government"), while from 1954 to 1957 he was president of the National Assembly, so the Maršalat obstructed the view from both buildings. The building was demolished most likely as the expansion of the Pioneer's Park, former Royal Garden, began, and the massive gates into the park were already demolished.

Today 

Former complex today consists of only two buildings, Old Palace and New Palace. Today, the palace is home to the City Assembly of Belgrade. Visitors can take a tour inside the Old Palace. Tourists can sign up to visit the Old Palace at the tourist stands throughout Belgrade.

Architectural design 

The Old Palace has almost square foundation of 40x40 m. Its design is classical, with central windowed inner hall. There used to be a greenhouse and richly ornamented oaken stairs added later, and leading onto the first floor (they were designed by a famous architect Jovan Ilkić). Those stairs were destroyed in World War I. Around this central space with columns and galleries there were other rooms of the Palace, the most important of them being the great hall for receptions and balls and the dining room. As parts of the Palace there were also a nicely arranged library and the Palace chapel, which faced the garden. The whole interior equipment of the Palace has been mostly imported from Vienna.

By its external architecture the building is one of the most beautiful achievements of academism in Serbia of the 19th century. The facade which faces the garden is most richly made, having projecting balconies which provided closer contact with the garden. The most characteristic motifs of this facade are the caryatids at the first-floor level which, above the balconies at each end of the facade support richly made tympanums of the ending windows. The caryatid are repeated on the facade facing the Kralja Milana street, and the line of Doric columns in beneath them. The Doric columns also appear on the facade against the garden, between richly decorated windows. The other two facades are somewhat simpler. The basement and the corners of the building are rustically designed. The balconies and the attic are balustraded. The three corners of the building used to have proportional domes.

References

External links 

 Stari dvor – City of Belgrade website 

Buildings and structures in Belgrade
Palaces in Serbia
Royal residences in Serbia
Legislative buildings
Houses completed in 1884
Architecture in Serbia